The seventh Central American Championships in Athletics were held at the Estadio Revolución in Ciudad de Panamá, Panamá, between November 24-26, 1972.

Medal summary
Some results and medal winners could be reconstructed from the archive of Costa Rican newspaper La Nación.

Men

Women

Medal table (after two days)
The table below displays the medal count after 2 of 3 competition days.

References

 
Central American Championships in Athletics
Central American Championships in Athletics
Central American Championships in Athletics
20th century in Panama City
International athletics competitions hosted by Panama
Sports competitions in Panama City